SUSD may refer to:

Safford Unified School District, a school district in Safford, Arizona
Sanders Unified School District, a school district in Apache County, Arizona
Saratoga Union School District, a school district in Saratoga, California
Saugus Union School District, a school district in Santa Clarita, California
Scottsdale Unified School District, a school district in Phoenix, Arizona
Shut Up & Sit Down, a board game review website and YouTube channel
Stockton Unified School District, a school district in Stockton, California
Sunnyside Unified School District, a school district in Tucson, Arizona

See also
Susd a village in Romania